Brent Briscoe (May 21, 1961 – October 18, 2017) was an American character actor and screenwriter.

Early life
Briscoe was born in Moberly, Missouri. After completing his education at the University of Missouri, Briscoe launched his career as a theater actor.

Career
He then segued into screenwriting and acting in feature films. He moved to Los Angeles permanently after working with Billy Bob Thornton on Sling Blade. He also frequently worked with Mark Fauser, who was his college roommate.

Death
Briscoe was hospitalized in October 2017 after suffering a fall. It led to internal bleeding and heart complications that resulted in his death on October 18, 2017 at the age of 56.

Filmography as actor

Filmography as writer
 Evening Shade (2 episodes, 1994)
 The Right to Remain Silent (1996) (teleplay)
 Waking Up in Reno (2002)

References

External links

1961 births
2017 deaths
Male actors from Missouri
American male film actors
American male screenwriters
American male television actors
American television writers
People from Moberly, Missouri
University of Missouri alumni
American male television writers
Screenwriters from Missouri